Garbuzovo is a rural locality (a selo) and the administrative center of Garbuzovskoye Rural Settlement, Alexeyevsky District, Belgorod Oblast, Russia. The population was 665 as of 2010. There are 3 streets.

Geography 
Garbuzovo is located 21 km south of Alexeyevka (the district's administrative centre) by road. Pokladov is the nearest rural locality.

References 

Rural localities in Alexeyevsky District, Belgorod Oblast
Biryuchensky Uyezd